Mule was an American punk blues band from Michigan, active in the early 1990s. Formed from the ashes of Wig and Laughing Hyenas, their music incorporated elements of hardcore punk, blues-rock,  and country music.

History
Mule formed in Ann Arbor, Michigan in 1991, anchored by former Wig member P.W. Long. The band's other members, Kevin Munro and Jim Kimball, had been members of the Laughing Hyenas. This lineup recorded the band's self-titled debut, which was produced by Steve Albini and released on Chicago record label Quarterstick Records itself a division of indie super label Touch and Go.

Kimball left the group in 1994 to join The Denison/Kimball Trio, and Daniel Jacob Wilson joined the group for their follow-up releases. If I Don't Six followed in 1994.

Mule self produced and released two singles on Detroit's independent Nocturnal Records. The first is "Tennessee Hustler", backed by "Black Bottom". The second was the "I'm Hell" single backed by a cover of the Bee Gees hit song To Love Somebody. Next up is "Charger" from the Jabberjaw compilation.

Long split the band up in 1996 to go solo. He formed P.W. Long's Reelfoot in 1997 with Mac McNeilly from The Jesus Lizard.

Members
P.W. Long - guitar, vocals
Kevin Munro - bass
Jim Kimball - drums (1991–1994)
Daniel Jacob Wilson - drums (1994–1995)
Jason Kourkounis - drums (1995–1996)

Discography

1992 - Tennessee Hustler/Black Bottom - 7-inch, Nocturnal Records 
1992 - I'm Hell/To Love Somebody - 7-inch, Quarterstick Records
1993 - Mule - LP/CD/CS,  Quarterstick Records 
1994 - Wrung - 12-inch EP/CD/CS,  Quarterstick Records 
1994 - If I Don't Six - LP/CD/CS,  Quarterstick Records 
1997 - Soul Sound - a split 7-inch w/ Shellac, Laff & Go Records

Also Appears On: 
1993 - Dead End Destiny Compilation   Tennessee Hustler 
1994 - Jabberjaw Compilation - Good To The Last Drop (CD, Comp) Charger Mammoth Records 
1996 - Metallurgy2 - Reasons To Be Fearful (CD, Comp) Charger Hard Stuff Division 
2006 - Sweet Fifteen - 1991 To 2006 Mississippi Breaks Rough Trade Records

References

Indie rock musical groups from Michigan
Quarterstick Records artists
Musical groups established in 1991
Musical groups disestablished in the 1990s